In mathematics, Sobolev orthogonal polynomials are orthogonal polynomials with respect to a Sobolev inner product, i.e. an inner product with derivatives.

By having conditions on the derivatives, the Sobolev orthogonal polynomials in general no longer share some of the nice features that classical orthogonal polynomials have.

Sobolev orthogonal polynomials are named after Sergei Lvovich Sobolev.

Definition
Consider the inner product

and let  be the corresponding Sobolev space. The Sobolev orthogonal polynomials  are defined as

where  denotes the Kronecker delta. One says that these polynomials are sobolev orthogonal.

Explanation
Classical orthogonal polynomials are Sobolev orthogonal polynomials, since their derivatives are also orthogonal polynomials.
Sobolev orthogonal polynomials in general are no longer commutative in the multiplication operator with respect to the inner product, i.e.

Consequently neither Favard's theorem, the three term recurrence or the Christoffel-Darboux formula hold. There exist however other recursion formulas for certain types of measures.
There exist a lot of literature for the case .

Literature

References

Orthogonal polynomials
Sobolev spaces